Senator Searcy may refer to:

Lemuel Searcy (1882–1944), Missouri State Senate
Sam Searcy (born 1977), North Carolina State Senate